Vexillum pardale is a species of sea snail, a marine gastropod mollusk, in the family Costellariidae, the ribbed miters.

Description
The shell size varies between 14 and 20 millimeters in length.

Distribution
This species is distributed in the Red Sea, in the Indian Ocean along Mauritius, Aldabra Atoll, and the Mascarene Basin, and in the Western Pacific Ocean except for along Hawaii.

References

 Taylor, J.D. (1973). Provisional list of the mollusca of Aldabra Atoll.
 Michel, C. (1988). Marine molluscs of Mauritius. Editions de l'Ocean Indien. Stanley, Rose Hill. Mauritius 
 Drivas, J. & M. Jay (1988). Coquillages de La Réunion et de l'île Maurice
 Turner H. 2001. Katalog der Familie Costellariidae Macdonald, 1860. Conchbooks. 1–100
page(s): 49

External links
 
  Liénard, Élizé. Catalogue de la faune malacologique de l'île Maurice et de ses dépendances comprenant les îles Seychelles, le groupe de Chagos composé de Diego-Garcia, Six-îles, Pèros-Banhos, Salomon, etc., l'île Rodrigues, l'île de Cargados ou Saint-Brandon. J. Tremblay, 1877.
 W.O.Cernohorsky, The Mitridae of Fiji - The Veliger v. 8 (1965-1966)

pardale
Gastropods described in 1840